is a Japanese communist and member of the Japanese Red Army (JRA), responsible for the massacre of 26 passengers at Ben-Gurion International Airport in Israel.

Biography
Kozo Okamoto is the youngest child of a school principal. He was a 24-year-old botany student when he was recruited to the Japanese Red Army. He was later detained in Lebanon. During his stay in Lebanon, Okamoto converted to Islam.

Lod Airport massacre
On May 30, 1972, Kōzō Okamoto along with Yasuyuki Yasuda, and Tsuyoshi Okudaira, landed at Israel's Lod Airport via Air France Flight 132 from Rome. After disembarking from the plane the three members of the JRA proceeded to the baggage claim area. Upon retrieving their luggage, they took out automatic weapons packed inside the suitcases and opened fire on other passengers in the baggage claim area.

The attack was a joint operation of the Popular Front for the Liberation of Palestine – External Operations (PFLP-EO), and the Japanese Red Army. The idea behind the joint effort was for the JRA to carry out attacks for the PLFP, and vice versa, in order to reduce suspicion. The plan worked, as Okamoto and his comrades attracted little attention prior to their attack.

Okamoto and his comrades killed 26 people and wounded 80 more. Seventeen of the victims were Christian pilgrims from Puerto Rico.

Yasuyuki Yasuda was accidentally shot dead by one of the other attackers. Tsuyoshi Okudaira was killed by one of his own grenades, either due to premature detonation or a suicide. Kōzō Okamoto was wounded and captured trying to escape the terminal.

Trial and release
Okamoto was tried in an Israeli military court under the 1948 Emergency Regulations. His court-appointed lawyers were Max Kritzman and David Rotlevy. Chicago-born and British-trained Kritzman, who was chief lawyer, had experience defending Israelis charged under the Emergency Regulations. Of Okamoto, he complained that "this man will not cooperate." Okamoto pleaded guilty, ensuring that he did not get sentenced to death. He also protested his attorneys' requests for a psychiatric evaluation. In his final statement he told the court: "When I was a child, I was told that when people died they became stars...We three Red Army soldiers wanted to become Orion when we died."

Okamoto was convicted and sentenced to life imprisonment in Israel. During the incarceration, he requested to convert to Judaism and tried to circumcise himself with nail clippers.

On 20 July 1973, PFLP and JRA operatives hijacked Japan Air Lines Flight 404, demanding Okamoto's release in exchange for the hostages on board; Israel refused to comply. Okamoto was released in 1985 after 13 years in prison, as part of the Jibril Agreement, a prisoner exchange with Palestinian militant factions for captive Israeli soldiers. After his release from prison in Israel, Kōzō Okamoto moved to Libya, then Syria, and finally to Lebanon where he reunited with other members of the Japanese Red Army.

Asylum in Lebanon
On 15 February 1997, Lebanon detained five Red Army members, Haruo Wakō, Masao Adachi, Mariko Yamamoto, Kazuo Tohira and Okamoto for using forged passports and visa violations. They were sentenced to three years in prison. The sentence was passed by Judge Soheil Abdul-Shams on 31 July 1997. After their prison term was completed, the four other members of the JRA were forcibly deported to Jordan and from Amman, Jordan via a chartered Russian plane to Japan. The Lebanese government, however, granted political asylum to Okamoto because, according to the Lebanese government, he "had participated in resistance operations against Israel and had been tortured in Israeli jails."

Okamoto is still wanted by the Japanese government and Japan has requested his extradition. , he was reported to be living in a refugee camp near Beirut.
In May 2017, Okamoto gave an interview to the Mainichi Shimbun in Beirut. He said "I want to return to Japan once".

On 30 May 2022, Okamoto appeared at a ceremony in Beirut marking the 50th anniversary of the attack, laying a wreath on the graves of his fellow JRA militants and posing for photos with PFLP supporters.

See also

Aharon Katzir, recipient of the Israeli Prize in life science, one of the Lod Airport massacre victims

References

External links
Press Conference The Ministry of Foreign Affairs of Japan 21 March 2000. Regarding the arrest of members of the JRA.
The Terrorist Attack on Lod Airport: 40 Years After,King Hussein Expresses Sympathy, the Government Considers the Death Penalty, Israel State Archives

1947 births
Living people
Japanese Muslims
Converts to Islam
Japan–State of Palestine relations
Japanese mass murderers
People convicted of murder by Israel
Palestine Liberation Organization
Japanese people imprisoned abroad
Japanese people convicted of murder
Japanese prisoners sentenced to life imprisonment
Prisoners sentenced to life imprisonment by Israel
Prisoners and detainees of Lebanon
People from Kumamoto Prefecture
Japanese Red Army

sv:Japanska röda armén#Medlemmar